James Randall (born 1904) was an English professional footballer who played as an outside left.

Career
Born Ashington, Randall played for Ashington, Bradford City and Derby County. For Bradford City, he made 57 appearances in the Football League; he also made 6 FA Cup appearances.

Sources

References

1904 births
Year of death missing
English footballers
Ashington A.F.C. players
Bradford City A.F.C. players
Derby County F.C. players
English Football League players
Association football outside forwards